Death to 2021 is a 2021 mockumentary produced by Netflix. A sequel to Death to 2020, the special features a series of fictional characters discussing US news in 2021, including the COVID-19 pandemic, vaccine misinformation and Big Tech.

Cast
Credits adapted from Radio Times.

 Hugh Grant as Tennyson Foss, a right-wing historian
 Joe Keery as Duke Goolies, a social media influencer
 William Jackson Harper as Zero Fournine, a social media company CEO
 Lucy Liu as Snook Austin, a journalist
 Tracey Ullman as Madison Madison, a far-right conspiracy theorist news anchor
 Samson Kayo as Pyrex Flask, a scientist researching SARS-CoV-2
 Stockard Channing as Penn Parker, a journalist
 Cristin Milioti as Kathy Flowers, a mother who supports Donald Trump and believes conspiracy theories
 Diane Morgan as Gemma Nerrick, a member of the public

Production
Death to 2021 was a sequel to Death to 2020, both productions of Broke and Bones—a company founded by Charlie Brooker and Annabel Jones, best-known for their work on science fiction anthology series Black Mirror. It followed several years of Weekly Wipe specials, hosted by Brooker, that humorously recapped news events from the year. Death to 2020 received negative critical reception.

For the 2021 special, Brooker had a reduced role—a Netflix spokesperson told British Comedy Guide that he was working on other productions for the streaming service. A number of cast from 2020 returned, but others—for example, Lucy Liu, Stockard Channing and William Jackson Harper—debuted in 2021. Ullman plays a different character to the 2020 special—an American news anchor, rather than the Queen.

Reception
Entertainment.ies Eoghan Cannon rated the film 2.5 out of 5, saying that it would be "unwatchable" without the strong cast, and is not sufficiently memorable for viewers to remember it the next morning. However, Cannon praised the coverage of light-hearted stories. Ed Power of The Daily Telegraph gave it 1 star, lambasting it as lacking originality and nuance. He negatively portrayed the absence of Brooker, calling it a negative image of Black Mirror, but praised Morgan's joking comparison of Squid Game to The Great British Bake Off.

Screen Rant criticized that the special had a "refusal to talk about cultural events outside of Netflix's domain", with segments about their original productions Bridgerton and Squid Game but omitting other television and film of the year. According to The National, a joke about Glasgow being part of London was well-received by Scottish viewers. Bruce Dessau of Beyond the Joke wrote that Death to 2021 was targeted at an American audience, to a further extent than the previous year's special. Dessau praised Morgan, Grant and Kayo, and said that pushback to a joke about Prince Philip's death came from people "that [have] clearly not seen a Brooker programme before".

References

External links 
 
 
 

2021 films
Films set in 2021
English-language Netflix original films
2020s mockumentary films
Films about the COVID-19 pandemic
2020s English-language films
COVID-19 pandemic in the United States in popular culture